Rijeka Synagogue was the main city synagogue in Rijeka, Croatia. It was destroyed by Nazis in 1944.

The first Jews settled in Rijeka from the Italian Adriatic coast in the 15th century. The Jewish community of Rijeka was established on September 26, 1781. The first Rijeka synagogue was located in a three-storey house. In 1901, the Jewish community of Rijeka had 2,600 members. 

Construction of the new synagogue began after the Jewish community of Rijeka collected voluntary contribution for the construction of the synagogue. Construction began in 1902 at Via del Pomerio 31, and it was finished on September 18, 1903. The new Rijeka Synagogue was opened on October 22, 1903. The interior of the synagogue was built in the Mudéjar style.

The Rijeka Synagogue was destroyed on January 25, 1944, during the Nazi occupation of Rijeka.

A small Orthodox synagogue still exists in Rijeka; it was built in 1930 in a rationalist style, and is one of the very few synagogues in Croatian territory that survived the destruction of the Nazi period. It is located on Ivan Filipović Street.

Gallery

References

Bibliography

 

Ashkenazi Jewish culture in Croatia
Ashkenazi synagogues
Synagogues completed in 1903
Former synagogues in Croatia
Destroyed synagogues in Croatia
Synagogues destroyed by Nazi Germany
Buildings and structures in Rijeka
Buildings and structures demolished in 1944
Culture in Rijeka
Buildings and structures destroyed during World War II